The Shadow Mountain Lookout, also known as the Shadow Mountain Patrol Cabin, was built in Rocky Mountain National Park in 1932, to the design of the National Park Service San Francisco Landscape Architecture Division.  It was regarded as one of the best National Park Service Rustic buildings in the national park system. It is now the only fire lookout surviving in Rocky Mountain National Park. Three other lookouts, now gone, were located at Twin Sisters Peak, the north fork of the Thompson River and near Long's Peak. The lookout was built by Civilian Conservation Corps labor.

Situated at an elevation of 9923 feet, the lookout is a three-story structure, with the first two stories in stone masonry, appearing to grow from a rock outcropping.  The frame third story is topped by a pyramidal roof. The structure is near the summit of Shadow Mountain, looking over Grand Lake. The first floor has been used for visitor contact, while the second floor has been used as employee accommodation, usually for a married couple who would keep watch and deal with the public. The last summer season for use was 1978.

See also
National Register of Historic Places listings in Grand County, Colorado

References

Government buildings completed in 1932
Towers completed in 1932
Park buildings and structures on the National Register of Historic Places in Colorado
National Park Service rustic in Colorado
Civilian Conservation Corps in Colorado
Buildings and structures in Grand County, Colorado
National Register of Historic Places in Rocky Mountain National Park
Fire lookout towers in Colorado
Fire lookout towers on the National Register of Historic Places
National Register of Historic Places in Grand County, Colorado
1932 establishments in Colorado